Gradaterebra lightfooti is a species of sea snail, a marine gastropod mollusk in the family Terebridae, the auger snails.

Distribution
It is found in Table Bay, Cape Point, Brown's Bank, False Bay, and Saldanha Bay, South Africa. The type locality is Table Bay.

References

External links
 

Terebridae
Molluscs of the Atlantic Ocean
Endemic fauna of South Africa
Gastropods described in 1899
Taxa named by Edgar Albert Smith